Manuel López (born 30 November 1995) is an Argentine professional footballer who plays as a striker for Chilean Primera División side Deportes Copiapó.

Career
As a child, Lopéz was with the club Aristóbulo del Valle from Vicente López, Buenos Aires until he joined Colegiales, making his professional debut in 2013 at the age of 17 in the Primera División B. He stayed with Colegiales until 2018, with a brief test step in Turkey, playing after for UAI Urquiza and Flandria in the same division.

In 2020, he moved to Chile and signed with Deportes Antofagasta, being loaned to Rangers de Talca in the Primera B. On first half 2021, he was loaned to Lautaro de Buin, but the team couldn't play in any division due to regulation issues. On second half 2021, he joined Deportes Copiapó, becoming the top goalscorer of the 2021 Primera B.

In 2022, he returned to Deportes Antofagasta, taking part in the 2022 Copa Sudamericana and scoring the goal for the first win of his team against a foreign team in the match against Atlético Goianiense.

Honours

Individual
 Primera B de Chile Top Goalscorer: 2021

References

External links
 
 Manuel López at playmakerstats.com (English version of ceroacero.es)

1995 births
Living people
Footballers from Buenos Aires
Argentine footballers
Argentine expatriate footballers
Association football forwards
Club Atlético Colegiales (Argentina) players
UAI Urquiza players
Flandria footballers
C.D. Antofagasta footballers
Rangers de Talca footballers
Lautaro de Buin footballers
Deportes Copiapó footballers
Primera B Metropolitana players
Primera B de Chile players
Chilean Primera División players
Argentine expatriate sportspeople in Chile
Expatriate footballers in Chile